Hsing Wu University (HWU) is a private university located in Linkou District, New Taipei, Taiwan.

History
HWU was originally established in 1965. It was upgraded to Hsing Wu College in 2000 and to Hsing Wu University in 2012.

President

Academics (undergraduate & master)
 College of Business Management
 Department of Marketing and Distribution Management (including master)In this fast-changing working environment along with the rapid development of technology, the department makes the most efforts to cultivate new talents in tune with the times. Thus, the department develops four major themes such as 'E-commerce and Internet Marketing', 'New Retail O2O', 'Sports Marketing' and 'New Media Community Marketing'  . The abundant practical courses are combined with faculty members to improve students' professionalism and make them as top talents.
 Department of Business Administration
 Department of International BusinessAlong with the prime resources of B2B cross-border e-commerce have been introduced, with the practical competitions, lectures, internships, and the innovational course programming, students in the department learn about the abilities and attitudes needed in the workplace sequentially. The department achieved spectacular results in National B2B e-commerce competition and New Taipei City e-commerce university competition in recent years.
 Department of Wealth Management
 Department of Information Management
 Department of Finance
 
 College of Tourism and Hospitality
 Department of Tourism and Leisure (including master)The Department of Tourism & Leisure (DTL) was founded in 1965 as a pioneer and has been playing an important role in the academic field in Taiwan. For more than half a century, the Department has been working on cultivating tourism industry professionals as well as graduates who have been well received in the industry.
 Department of Hospitality and ManagementThe College of Tourism and Hospitality founded in 1965, was the earliest department of travel management among nationwide universities and colleges.  Over the past 50 years, alumnus had outstanding performances and occupied important positions in the workplace. Furthermore, they spare effort in helping juniors.
 Department of Travel AviationThe Department of Travel and Aviation Management cultivates professional talents in "travel industry" and "aviation services industry" to meet the demands of the human resource market of the relevant industries and government governance priorities in the future. 77 students in the department obtained national tour leader licenses in 2018, which was the champion in the universities of northern Taiwan.
 Department of Applied EnglishThe curriculum of the undergraduate program is composed of English Teaching Module and Tourism English Module. The English Teaching Module includes theoretical and practical courses in teaching English for children, while the Tourism English Module integrates English with tourism-related industries to enhance students' multiple potentials and professionalism. Other languages such as Korean and Japanese are also taught as optional classes. 
 College of Popular Arts 
 Department of Applied Information Technology (including master)
 Department of New Media Communication
 Department of Performing ArtsBesides the courses, the department regularly organizes annual lectures with performance master and artist. Each semester, the department schedules the final performance, welcome party including dance or singing performances, Festivals of related communities, entertainment industry visiting, industry internship etc. to have students experience real performance training. In order to expand students' international horizons, students from the department have been studying as an exchange student in Chung Ang University in Korea since University 2018. Also, students can apply for dual degree program in Middlesex University in United Kingdom to experience total five year program.
The courses and activities are coordinated with the development of relevant industries in the region, so that students can successfully connect with the job market. In recent years, the performing arts industry is booming, and the demand for  related-skill talent continue to grow. After graduation, students can directly enter into the related industries such as: music, dance, drama, model and hosting. Behind the scenes, including screenwriters, directors, performance manager, planning, art administration and management training also included.
 Bachelor Program of Popular MusicThe 'Popular Music Program' was established in 2018. It is based on professional music writing and performance and cooperates with practical training and internship. The program commits to fostering an inclusive and diverse environment for the community it serves. The prime of the educational goal is dedicated to inspiring artistic and academic excellence while preparing students for careers in the music and entertainment industry.

 College of Design
 Department of Fashion Design establishing in 2011, The goal of fashion department is cultivating the industrial fashion marketing talents, and the curriculum focuses on training fashion brand marketing business and movie industrial creative styling talents. The practical ability as core of the education foundation. The department promotes the full-time internship system during student’s senior year and flexible internship to facilitate students to connect with the industry earlier and strengthen the competitiveness in the workplace.
The main professional course of our department divide with two modules, which is ”Overall fashion stylist” and “Runway planning”: Cultivating fashion design talents with professional knowledge.
 Department of Commercial Design
 Department of Digital DesignMultimedia In today's environment where the online communities is developed, the traditional way of presentation can no longer be highlighted. Accordingly, we adjust to new surroundings by integrating various technologies in cross domains, such as technology, fashion, artificial intelligence etc. The smart multimedia presented is an essential element of new generation of media, and the virtual reality integrated media that combines virtual animation and visual effects with real shooting images. Therefore, virtual reality, augmented reality, visual effects, and character animation production are the main content of department promotion, especially the physical effects of water, smoke, fire and blasting that are most needed by the Hollywood film industry in United States. Digital design department invites the professional lecturers to teach our students to ensure the students learn the professional skills what the industry looks for. 
 Department of Fashion Industry Management

 College of Hsing Wu & Eelin Entertainment 
 College of Hsing Wu & Sanlih E-Television

Notable alumni
 Liu Ping-wei, politician, member of the Legislative Yuan (1999–2002)
 Danson Tang, model, actor and singer
 Mini Tsai, actress, singer and television host
 Prince Chiu, model, actor, singer, and television host

Transportation
The university is accessible northeast from Chang Gung Memorial Hospital Station of Taoyuan Airport MRT.

See also
 List of universities in Taiwan

References

[[Official Youtube Channel|https://www.youtube.com/channel/UCg3gbMW9-sobQ6BjUU6RwHQ/about]

External links

 

 
1965 establishments in Taiwan